Phyllonorycter suaveolentis is a moth of the family Gracillariidae. It is found in the mountains of Corsica.

The larvae feed on Alnus viridis suaveolens. They mine the leaves of their host plant. They create a small, oval, lower-surface tentiform mine between two side veins. There are several folds which are very similar. The frass is deposited in two bands at either side of the cocoon.

References

suaveolentis
Moths of Europe
Moths described in 1904